There have been five creations of  Fletcher baronets from 1641 to 1919, three of which are extinct.  The creations of 1782 and 1796 have descended to male descendants who have changed surnames to recognise further early inheritance and are the existing Fletcher hereditary titles in the Great British baronetcy.

The first two creations were to first cousins (three times removed upwards or downwards respectively).

Fletcher baronets of Hutton le Forest (1641)

Sir Henry Fletcher, 1st Baronet (died 1645)
Sir George Fletcher, 2nd Baronet (1633–1700)
Sir Henry Fletcher, 3rd Baronet (1661–1712)
Extinct on his death

Fletcher, later Aubrey-Fletcher baronets, of Clea Hall (& Ashley Park) (1782)
see Aubrey-Fletcher baronets

Fletcher, later Boughey baronets, of Newcastle-under-Lyme (1796)
see Boughey baronets

Fletcher baronets of Carrow (1812)

The Fletcher Baronetcy, of Carrow in the County of Cork is a title in the Baronetage of the United Kingdom. It was created on 14 December 1812.

Sir Richard Fletcher, 1st Baronet (1768–1813)
Sir Richard John Fletcher, 2nd Baronet (1805–1876)
Extinct on his death

Fletcher baronets of Ashe Ingen Court (1919)
The Fletcher Baronetcy, of Ashe Ingen Court, in the Parish of Bridstow, in the County of Hereford was a title in the Baronetage of the United Kingdom. The escutcheon was blazoned azure, a stag's head erased within an orle of eight arrows points downward, argent.

Sir John Samuel Fletcher, 1st Baronet (1841–1924)
Extinct on his death

References

 

Baronetcies in the Baronetage of Great Britain
Extinct baronetcies in the Baronetage of England
Extinct baronetcies in the Baronetage of the United Kingdom
1641 establishments in England